Tied to a Chair is a 2011 American-French-British comedy film written and directed by Michael Bergmann and starring Mario Van Peebles, Bonnie Loren, Robert Gossett and Sayed Badreya.

Cast
Bonnie Loren as Naomi Holbroke
Mario Van Peebles as Billy Rust
Robert Gossett as Det. Peter Farrell
Richard Franklin as Henry Holbroke
Sayed Badreya as Kamal
Ali Marsh as Liz
Joselin Reyes as Detective Rosalie Aragon

Release
The film premiered in Manhattan on May 27, 2011.

Reception
The film has a 0% rating on Rotten Tomatoes based on five reviews.

Jeannette Catsoulis of The New York Times gave the film a negative review and wrote, "Insulting several nationalities and most of the filmgoing public, Tied to a Chair lurches through acting atrocities, continuity glitches and narrative gaps with grating insouciance."

Diego Semerene of Slant Magazine awarded the film one and a half stars out of four and wrote that it "mostly suffers from a sense of confusion that never reads like bona fide experimentalism, just aimlessness."

References

External links